Banks Township is the name of a few townships in the United States:

Banks Township, Fayette County, Iowa
Banks Township, Michigan
Banks Township, Carbon County, Pennsylvania
Banks Township, Indiana County, Pennsylvania

Township name disambiguation pages